Tennessee Law Review began in 1922 and is published by the Tennessee Law Review Association which is based within the University of Tennessee College of Law, Knoxville. The journal is published quarterly and edited is by University of Tennessee Law students.

See also 
 List of law reviews in the United States

References

External links 
 
 University's website

American law journals
General law journals
Law journals edited by students
Publications established in 1922
University of Tennessee